Roland Suso Richter (born January 7, 1961 in Marburg) is a German film director and producer.

Biography 
Richter was born in Marburg and lived there until making his Abitur in 1980 at the local Elisabethschule. Wanting to pursue a film career, he worked as an intern for video productions and as an actor on stage. In 1982, he appeared as an extra in Rainer Werner Fassbinder's Veronika Voss.

A year later, he and actor Frank Röth produced their first film, which was released in 1985. Many TV films followed until 14 Days to Life was released in 1997, earning Richter favorable reviews.

The 1999 film After the Truth, a fictional account of an 80-year-old Josef Mengele's trial before a German court, did not receive funding from the German film foundation due to its controversial theme. It was financed privately by lead actor Götz George and others, and received a number of awards on film festivals. He also directed Der Tunnel, a made-for-television movie loosely based on true events in Berlin following the closing of the East German border in August 1961 and the subsequent construction of the Berlin Wall.

In 2003, Richter gave his English-language directing debut with the psychological thriller The I Inside, starring Ryan Phillippe and Sarah Polley, which was compared to Memento and The Butterfly Effect.

Another of Richter's projects was the television movie Mogadischu, an account of the hijacking of Lufthansa Flight 181 in 1977 and its subsequent storming by the GSG 9 counter-terrorism unit.

Filmography 
1984: 
1990: Alles Paletti (TV series)
1992: Frohes Fest, Lucie! (TV film)
1992: Freunde fürs Leben (TV series)
1994: Svens Geheimnis (TV film)
1994: Alles außer Mord: Der Name der Nelke (TV series episode)
1994:  (TV film)
1994: Polizeiruf 110: Samstags, wenn Krieg ist (TV series episode)
1995: Risiko Null – Der Tod steht auf dem Speiseplan (TV film)
1997: Buddies (TV film)
1997: 14 Days to Life
1998:  (TV film)
1999: Sara Amerika
1999: After the Truth
2000: A Handful of Grass
2001: The Tunnel (TV film)
2003: The I Inside
2004: Sterne leuchten auch am Tag (TV film)
2005:  (TV film)
2006: Dresden (TV film)
2007:  (TV film)
2007: Annas Alptraum kurz nach 6 (TV film)
2008: Mogadischu (TV film)
2010:  (TV film)
2011: Jungle Child
2014:  (TV film)
2014: Ein todsicherer Plan (TV film)
2014: Der Weg nach San José (TV film)
2015:  (TV film)
2016:  (TV film)

References

External links 

Roland Suso Richter at -films.de
Roland Suso Richter at regieguide.de (German)

1961 births
Living people
People from Marburg
Mass media people from Hesse
Best Director German Film Award winners